Ditte Søby Hansen (born 3 February 1997) is a Danish badminton player. In 2015, she won gold medal at the European Junior Badminton Championships in girls' doubles event.

Achievements

European Junior Championships 
Girls' doubles

BWF International Challenge/Series 
Women's doubles

Mixed doubles

  BWF International Challenge tournament
  BWF International Series tournament
  BWF Future Series tournament

References

External links 
 

1997 births
Living people
People from Glostrup Municipality
Danish female badminton players
Sportspeople from the Capital Region of Denmark